Adelmo is a masculine Spanish and Italian given name. People named Adelmo include:

 Adelmo Bulgarelli (born 1932), Italian wrestler
 Adelmo Paris (born 1954), Italian footballer
 Adelmo Prenna (1930–2008), Italian footballer

Italian masculine given names